Sunity Academy is a higher secondary girls' school in Cooch Behar, West Bengal, India.

History 

The school was founded in 1881 as Sunity College by His Highness, the Maharaja of Cooch Behar. It was named after Her Highness Maharani Suniti Devi, who was the brain behind its establishment. She was the daughter of Keshub Chandra Sen.

The school was rechristened as Sunity Academy in 1916. In 1928, the Sunity Academy was affiliated to the University of Calcutta. However, the school is now attached to University of North Bengal since its inception in 1962.

In 1937, when the representative of the Governor General of the Eastern States came to visit Sunity Academy, he was highly impressed with its management.

In 2003, the erstwhile president of India, APJ Abdul Kalam visited the school. In 2004, Her Highness Gayatri Devi, the Rajmata of Jaipur and the Princess of Cooch Behar, paid a visit. In 2006, the school celebrated its 125th anniversary.

Maharani Suniti Devi's second son Maharaja Jitendra Narayan Bhup Bahadur's three daughters Princesses Ila, Gayatri and Menaka (Princesses of Cooch Behar) appeared for their matriculation examination from Sunity Academy.

Notable alumni 
 Anjana Bhowmick, actress
 Aparajita Goppi, politician and activist
Parvathy Baul, performing artist

See also
Nripendra Narayan Memorial High School
Jenkins School

References 

Schools in the princely states of India
Schools in Colonial India
Girls' schools in West Bengal
High schools and secondary schools in West Bengal
Colleges affiliated to University of North Bengal
Schools in Cooch Behar district
Educational institutions established in 1881
1881 establishments in India